Thomas Melvin Jewell (born 13 January 1991) is an English cricketer.  Jewell is a right-handed batsman who bowls right-arm fast-medium.  He was born at Reading, Berkshire.

Jewell made his first-class debut for Surrey against Loughborough UCCE in 2008.  He represented the county in 3 first-class matches in 2010 against Cambridge University, the touring Bangladeshis, as well as making his County Championship debut against Northamptonshire.

His debut in List-A cricket came against Northamptonshire in the 2009 Pro40 and he went on to play a total of 8 List-A games. He was released by Surrey in 2014.

References

External links
Tom Jewell at Cricinfo
Tom Jewell at CricketArchive

1991 births
Living people
Sportspeople from Reading, Berkshire
English cricketers
Surrey cricketers